Serhiy Anatoliiovych Petrenko (born September 10, 1968) is a Ukrainian-Russian retired ice hockey left wing. He was drafted in the seventh round, 168th overall, by the Buffalo Sabres in the 1993 NHL Entry Draft and played 14 games for Buffalo during the 1993–94 NHL season.

Career
Petrenko spent the majority of his career playing in the Russian Hockey Super League. He played six seasons for HC Dynamo Moscow, and was a member of the Unified Team which won the gold medal at the 1992 Winter Olympics, before going to North America to join the Sabres' organization. He appeared in 81 games over two seasons with Buffalo's American Hockey League affiliate, the Rochester Americans; he also appeared in 14 NHL games with the Sabres during the 1993–94 season, recording four assists.

Following his brief North American career, Petrenko played three more seasons with Dynamo Moscow, one each in Switzerland's Nationalliga A and the Czech Republic's Czech Extraliga, and then spent the final three seasons of his career with three different Russian Super League teams.

In 1993, he won the World Championships with the Russian national team.

In 1991, Petrenko won Tampere Cup. He also won 4 national championships.

Career statistics

Regular season and playoffs

International

External links

1968 births
Living people
Sportspeople from Kharkiv
Buffalo Sabres draft picks
Buffalo Sabres players
HC Davos players
HC Dynamo Moscow players
Metallurg Novokuznetsk players
HC Sibir Novosibirsk players
HC Vítkovice players
Ice hockey players at the 1992 Winter Olympics
Medalists at the 1992 Winter Olympics
Molot-Prikamye Perm players
Oji Eagles players
Olympic gold medalists for the Unified Team
Olympic ice hockey players of the Unified Team
Olympic medalists in ice hockey
Rochester Americans players
Russian ice hockey left wingers
Severstal Cherepovets players
Soviet ice hockey left wingers
Ukrainian ice hockey left wingers
Ukrainian expatriate sportspeople in the United States
Ukrainian expatriate sportspeople in Japan
Ukrainian expatriate sportspeople in the Czech Republic
Ukrainian expatriate sportspeople in Switzerland
Ukrainian expatriate ice hockey people
Russian expatriate sportspeople in the United States
Russian expatriate sportspeople in Japan
Russian expatriate sportspeople in the Czech Republic
Russian expatriate sportspeople in Switzerland
Russian expatriate ice hockey people
Expatriate ice hockey players in the United States
Expatriate ice hockey players in Japan
Expatriate ice hockey players in the Czech Republic
Expatriate ice hockey players in Switzerland